Marielle Breton (born 26 October 1965) is a French football player who played as Defender for French club Juvisy FCF of the Division 1 Féminine. After retiring from football she decided to work in administration for  FC Lorient.

References

1965 births
Paris FC (women) players
French women's footballers
France women's international footballers
Women's association football defenders
Division 1 Féminine players
Living people